This is a list of towns and villages in County Limerick, Ireland.

A
Abbeyfeale - (Mainistir na Féile)
Abington - (Mainistir Uaithne)
Adare - (Áth Dara)
Ahane - (Atháin)
Anglesboro - (Gleann na gCreabhar)
Annacotty - (Áth na Coite/Áth an Choite)
Ardagh - (Árdach/Árdachadh)
Ardpatrick - (Árd Pádraig)
Ashford - (Áth na bhFuinseog)
Askeaton - (Eas Géitine/Eas Géibhtine/Eas Géiphtine)
Athea - (Áth an tSléibhe)
Athlacca - (An tÁth Leacach)

B
Ballingarry - (Baile an Gharraí/Baile an Gharrdha)
Ballyagran - (Béal Átha Grean)
Ballyhahill - (Baile Dhá Thuile/Baile Uí Sháithil)
Ballylanders - (Baile an Londraigh)
Ballyneety - (Baile an Fhaoitigh)
Ballyorgan - (Baile Uí Argáin)
Ballysteen - (Baile Stiabhna)
Banogue - (An Bhánóg)
Barna - (An Bhearna)
Barringtonsbridge - (Droichead Barrington)
Bohermore - (An Bóthar Mhór)
Broadford - (Béal an Átha)
Bruff - (An Brú/Brúgh na nDéise)
Bruree - (Brú Rí/Brú Rígh/Brúgh Ríogh)
Bulgaden - (Bulgaidín/Bulgidín)

C
Caherconlish - (Cathair Chinn Lis)
Cantogher/Kantoher - (Ceann Tóchair)
Cappamore - (An Cheapach Mhór)
Carrigkerry/Carrickerry - (Carraig Chiarraí)
Castleconnell - (Caisleán Uí gConaing/Caisleán Uí Chonaill)
Castlemahon/Mahoonagh - (Caisleán Maí Tamhnach/Maigh Tamhnach/Mathghamhnach)
Castletown Conyers - (Baile an Chaisleáin)
Clarina - (Clár Aidhne/Clár Einigh)
Cloncagh - (Cluain Cath/Cluain Catha)
Crecora - (Craobh Chumhra/Craobh Chomhartha)
Croagh - (Cróch/An Cruach)
Croom - (Cromadh)

D
Doon - (An Dún/Dún Bleisce)
Dromcollogher - (Drom Collachair)
Dromkeen - (Drom Chaoin)

E
Effin - (Eifinn/Eimhin)
Elton - (Eiltiún)

F
Fedamore - (Feadamair)
Feenagh - (Fíonach/Fíodhnach)
Feohanagh - (Feothanach)
Ferrybridge - (Droichead an Chalaidh)
Foynes - (Faing)

G
Galbally - (Gallbhaile)
Garryspillane - (Garraí Uí Spealáin/Garrdha Uí Spiolláin)
Glenbrohane - (Gleann Bhruacháin)
Glenroe - (An Gleann Rua/An Gleann Ruadh)
Glin - (An Gleann/Gleann Chorbraí)
Granagh - (Greanach)
Grange - (An Ghráinseach/An Ghráinsigh)

H
Herbertstown - (Baile Hiobaird/Baile Iorbairt/Cathair Fuiseog)
Hospital - (An tOspidéal/Ospidéal Gleann Áine)

K
Kilbehenny - (Coill Bheithne/Coill Mheithne)
Kilcolman - (Cill Chólmáin)
Kildimo - (Cill Díoma)
Kilfinnane - (Cill Fhíonáin)
Kilfinny - (Cill na Fíonaí)
Kilmallock - (Cill Mocheallóg/Cill Moicheallóg)
Kilmeedy - (Cill m'Íde/Cill Míde)
Kilteely - (Cill Tíle/Cill tSíle)
Knockaderry - (Cnoc an Doire)
Knockainey - (Cnoc Áine)
Knocklong - (Cnoc Loinge)

L
Limerick - (Luimneach)
Lisnagry - (Lios na Graí)

M
Martinstown - (Baile Mháirtín)
Meanus - (Méanas)
Montpelier - (Montpelier)
Mountcollins - (Cnoc Uí Choileáin)
Mungret - (Mungairit/Mungraid)
Murroe - (Máigh Rua/Mágh Ruadh/Má Rua)

N
Newbridge - (An Droichead Nua)
Newcastle West - (An Caisleán Nua Thiar)

O
Oola - (Úlla/Úbhla)

P
Pallasgreen - (Pailís Gréine/Pailís na Gréine/Pailís Ghréine)
Pallaskenry - (Pailís Chaonraí/Pailís Chaonraoí/Pailís Chaonraíghe)
Patrickswell - (Tobar Phádraig)

R
Raheenagh - (Ráithíneach)
Rathkeale - (Ráth Caola/Ráth Gaola)

S
Shanagolden - (Seanaghualainn)
Strand - (An Trá)

T
Templeglantine - (Teampall an Ghleanntáin)
Tournafulla - (Tuar na Fola)

References

 
Towns and villages